Fort Apache is, metaphorically, a building, complex, or defensive site providing shelter from hostile action in the form of crime (in police and crime drama) or native insurrection or enemy attack (in John Ford movies).

The metaphor is now used by military and police to refer to a post which is beset or besieged. Recent examples may be found in Afghanistan and Iraq.
Another example is "Fort Apache, The Bronx", a name used in the past for the NYPD's  41st Precinct Station House at 1086 Simpson Street in the Bronx and the 1981 movie named for it.

See also 
 Fort Apache (1948 John Ford film)
 Fort Apache, The Bronx (1981 film)

References 

English phrases